Estonia  competed at the 2013 Summer Universiade in Kazan, Russia from 6 to 17 July 2013. A total of 131 Estonian athletes participated in 17 sports.

Medalists

Athletics

Badminton

Basketball

Estonia qualified men's team.

Men
The men's team participated in Group A.

Belt wrestling

Boxing

Fencing

Football

Estonia qualified women's team.

Women
The women's team participated in Pool C.

Gymnastics

Judo

Rowing

Sambo

Shooting

Swimming

Table tennis

Tennis

Volleyball

Estonia qualified men's team.

Men
The men's team participated in Group A.

Wrestling

References 

Nations at the 2013 Summer Universiade
2013 in Estonian sport
Estonia at the Summer Universiade